Nobel is a geometric sans-serif typeface designed by Sjoerd Henrik de Roos (1877–1962) and Dick Dooijes (1909–1998) in the period 1929–1935 for the Amsterdam Type foundry). Capitalizing upon Lettergieterij Amsterdam's substantial financial interest in the Berlin typefoundry H. Berthold AG, de Roos decided as a Dutch competitor to Futura to license the Berthold foundry's geometric Berthold Grotesk, change some characters and sell it in the Netherlands under this name. The resulting face became very popular in Dutch printing.

Andrea Fuchs and Fred Smeijers of the Dutch Type Library (DTL) produced a revival in 1993. In the same year in the United States, Tobias Frere-Jones, then at Font Bureau, began a revival of the Nobel face. Cyrus Highsmith and Dyana Weissman later added the light weights. Frere-Jones described it as an interesting compromise between the purer geometry of Futura and traditional letters: "Futura cooked in dirty pots and pans."

Nobel WGL is a global version of Nobel used by Lexus in its literature and marketing materials. Nobel WGL also supports Turkish, Greek, Cyrillic, Vietnamese and Pan-European languages.

References

Bibliography
Friedl, Friedrich, Nicholas Ott and Bernard Stein. Typography: An Encyclopedic Survey of Type Design and Techniques Through History. Black Dog & Leventhal: 1998. .
Jaspert, Berry and Johnson. Encyclopaedia of Type Faces. Cassell Paperback, London; 2001. 
Macmillan, Neil. An A–Z of Type Designers. Yale University Press: 2006. .
Middendorp, Jan. Dutch Type. 010 Publishers: 2004. .

External links
Dutch Type Library web page for Nobel
Font Bureau web page for Nobel

Typefaces and fonts introduced in 1929
Geometric sans-serif typefaces
Letterpress typefaces
Digital typefaces
Typefaces designed by Tobias Frere-Jones